The 1994 Singapore Open (also known as the Konica Cup) was a four-star badminton tournament that took place at the Singapore Indoor Stadium in Singapore, from July 11 to July 17, 1994. The total prize money on offer was US$90,000.

Venue
Singapore Indoor Stadium

Final results

References

Singapore Open (badminton)
Singapore
1994 in Singaporean sport